Paul C. Adams is an American geographer who is Professor and Director of Urban Studies at the Department of Geography and the Environment at University of Texas at Austin. Adams applies various approaches from human geography to study media and communication. His research has helped develop the subdiscipline geography of media and communication by integrating studies of place representations, communication infrastructures, social processes, and routines of media use in daily life.

Education
In 1984, Adams received his Bachelor of Environmental Design (with Special Honors) from the University of Colorado at Boulder in Boulder, Colorado.  He received his M.S. in Geography in 1990 and his Ph.D. in Geography in 1993, both from the University of Wisconsin-Madison.

Career
Adams specializes in geography of communication technologies, nationalism, critical geopolitics, and representations of space and place. Before arriving at the University of Texas at Austin, Adams had held academic positions at Virginia Tech, the State University of New York at Albany, and Texas A&M University.

He has held visiting research and teaching fellowships at Karlstad University in Sweden, University of Bergen in Norway, and McGill University and Université de Montréal in Quebec. 
He has also held visiting professor appointments at Johannes Gutenberg University of Mainz, in Germany, and University of Canterbury, in Christchurch, New Zealand.

Selected publications

Adams, Paul C., 2017. Place and Extended Agency. In Distributed Agency: The Sharing of Intention, Cause, and Accountability edited by N. J. Enfield and P. Kockelman, pp. 213–220. Oxford University Press. 
Adams, Paul C. 2017. Tuanian Geography: A Tale of Contrasts and Nuances. In Place, Space and Hermeneutics, edited by Bruce Janz, pp. 275–288. Springer.  
Adams, Paul C., Julie Cupples, Kevin Glynn, André Jansson, & Shaun Moores, 2017. Communications/Media/Geographies, London and New York: Routledge. 
Adams, Paul C., 2016. Placing the Anthropocene: A Day in the Life of an Enviro-organism, Transactions of the Institute of British Geographers 41(1): 54-65. DOI:10.1111/tran.12103
Adams, Paul C., Jim Craine and Jason Dittmer, eds. 2014. The Ashgate Research Companion to Media Geography, Aldershot, UK: Ashgate Press. 
Gynnild, Astrid and Paul C. Adams, 2013. Animation, Documentary or Interactive Gaming? Exploring Communicative Aspects of Environmental Messaging Online, International Symposium on Online Journalism 3(1): 39-60.
Adams, Paul C., 2013. Communication in Virtual Worlds, in Oxford Handbook of Virtuality, edited by Mark Grimshaw.
Adams, Paul C. and Astrid Gynnild, 2013. Communicating Environmental Messages in Online Media: The Role of Place Environmental Communication 7(1): 113-130. DOI:10.1080/17524032.2012.754777
Adams, Paul C., 2012. Trajectories of the Nobel Peace Prize, Geopolitics 17(3): 553-577. DOI:10.1080/14650045.2011.604810
Adams, Paul C., 2012. Multilayered Regionalization in Northern Europe, GeoJournal 77: 293-313. 10.1007/s10708-011-9408-8
Adams, Paul C. and André Jansson, 2012. Communication Geography: A Bridge between Disciplines, Communication Theory 22: 298-317. DOI: 10.1111/j.1468-2885.2012.01406.x
Adams, Paul C., 2011. A Taxonomy for Communication Geography, Progress in Human Geography 35(1):37-57. DOI: 10.1177/0309132510368451
Skop, Emily, Paul C. Adams, 2009. Creating and Inhabiting Virtual Places: Indian Immigrants in Cyberspace, National Identities 11(2):127-147. DOI: 10.1080/14608940902891161
Adams, Paul C., 2009. Geographies of Media and Communication: A Critical Introduction, London: Wiley-Blackwell.
Adams, Paul C., 2007. Atlantic Reverberations: French Representations of an American Election, Aldershot, UK: Ashgate Press.
Adams, Paul C., 2005. The Boundless Self: Communication in Physical and Virtual Spaces, Syracuse, New York: Syracuse University Press.
Adams, Paul C., 2004. The September 11 Attacks as Viewed from Quebec: The Small-Nation Myth in Geopolitical Discourse, Political Geography 23 (6): 765-795.
Adams, Paul C., Rina Ghose, 2003. India.com: The Construction of a Space Between, Progress in Human Geography 27(4):414-437.
Adams, Paul C., Steven Hoelscher, and Karen Till, eds., 2001. Textures of Place: Exploring Humanist Geographies. Minneapolis: University of Minnesota Press.
Adams, Paul C., 2000. Application of a CAD-based Accessibility Model, Information, Place, and Cyberspace Springer Berlin Heidelberg.
Adams, Paul C., 1999. Bringing Globalization Home: A Homeworker in the Information Age, Urban Geography 20(4):356-376.
Adams, Paul C., 1998. Network Topologies and Virtual Place Annals of the Association of American Geographers 88(1):88-106.
Adams, Paul C., 1997. Cyberspace and Virtual Places "Geographical Review" 87(2):155-171.
Adams, Paul C., Barney Warf, 1997. Introduction: cyberspace and geographical space, Geographical Review 87(2):139-145.
Adams, Paul C., 1996. Protest and the Scale Politics of Telecommunications, Political Geography 15(5):419-441.
Adams, Paul C., 1995. A Reconsideration of Personal Boundaries in Space-Time, Annals of the Association of American Geographers 85(2):267-285.
Adams, Paul C., 1992. Television as Gathering Place, Annals of the Association of American Geographers 82(1):117-135.

See also
Geography of media and communication

Notes

External links
Paul C. Adams University of Texas profile 
Media and Communication Geography

Living people
American geographers
University of Colorado alumni
 University of Wisconsin–Madison College of Letters and Science alumni
University of Texas at Austin faculty
Year of birth missing (living people)
Virginia Tech faculty
University at Albany, SUNY faculty
Texas A&M University faculty